Events from the year 1781 in Canada.

Incumbents
Monarch: George III

Governors
Governor of the Province of Quebec: Frederick Haldimand
Governor of Nova Scotia: 
Commodore-Governor of Newfoundland: John Byron
Governor of St. John's Island: Walter Patterson

Events
 February 2 – Ethan Allen receives a further proposal from Col. Robinson; but sends both to Congress, with a request for the recognition of Vermont. Premising loyalty to Congress, he maintains that Vermont may properly treat with Great Britain, to prevent being subjected to another State, by the authority of a Government which Vermonters have helped to establish.
 April – Ira Allen is sent to Canada to arrange an exchange of prisoners.
 May 1 – Receiving proposals for Vermont's independence, Col. Ira Allen temporizes to prevent invasion and enable the farmers to sow seed for another crop.
 August 20 – As a condition of Vermont's admission to the Union, Congress fixes boundaries which offend both Vermont and New York.
 George Washington asks Governor Chittenden whether Vermont chooses to be a Province or in the Union.
 September – British proposals to Vermont include a Legislature of two branches.
 October 19 – Vermont declines Congress' terms.
 November 14 – Governor Chittenden answers General Washington that, notwithstanding Vermont's interest in the common cause, the people would rather join British Canadians than be subject to New York.
 December 18 – Troops sent from New York, to coerce New Hampshire grantees, learn that they will defend their rights.
 American independence is assured by the British surrender at Yorktown. Gen. George Washington leads the Colonial army against the British.
 By the Articles of Confederation, Congress controls the western lands.

Historical documents

American Revolutionary War
"Rebellion [is] so severely felt by many of His Majesty's well-disposed Subjects in the Neighbouring Colonies, [but we] live in Canada undisturbed"

Papers captured with Henry Laurens include plans for two U.S.-French invasions: one against Newfoundland and Halifax, and one into Canada in winter

"So near to Canada and the only land passage into it" - U.S. commander on upper Connecticut River says his sector is in greatest need of defence

Captured correspondence supposedly for Gov. Haldimand from British agent(s) in Albany is part of Canada–New York "chain of Intelligence"

If U.S. takes Nova Scotia, it will make Britain's main source of ship timber available to Spain and France, and also deprive British of fisheries' sailors

Butler's Rangers officer on fires and fights along Mohawk River, with his 400+ force (including 60 Indigenous fighters) engaging superior enemy numbers

Maj. Gen. Heath informs Washington of "a plan of union maturing between the british government in Canada, and some of the leading men of Vermont"

Despite failure to take it, Washington says "possession or destruction of Detroit is the only means of giving peace and security to the Western Frontier"

"True copy" of Washington letter asking Rochambeau for breeches for soldiers "ashamed of exposing their meagre posteriors to the ladies"

Canada
Resident of Canada reports British military and government "have the greatest distrust of the Canadians," many of whom (clergy included) are disaffected

Loyalist "Declaration of Independence" says rebels' fear of Catholics has shifted to promising Canadians "greater religious establishments"

Proclamation requires militia to account for all grain, flour and cattle in Quebec for possible quick movement to secure locations in case of invasion

"British Inhabitants of Montreal, in Town Meeting," thank Gov. Haldimand for warning of possible invasion and intend to find its aiders and abettors

Resident doubts wisdom of Quebec City physician who proposes inoculating people with imported smallpox "matter" after testing it on two children

Merchants ask convoy not to leave 5 days early, as "quantity of Furrs and Peltries from the most distant Posts of the Upper Country" will not have arrived

Two Queen's Loyal Rangers officers (and brothers) accused by commandant of selling military provisions and clothing and stealing soldiers' pay

On May 1, ice breaks up at Quebec City, which takes in "the knowing ones who had guaranteed it till the Spring tides;" several walked there day before

"Bad guinea" appears made of copper, looks like good "George III 1777" coin, but is 13 grains too light and leaves red colour when rubbed on stone

For sale "a Likely, Robust, Active, Healthy Negro Lad[...]; he speaks English and French both remarkably well, and has had the Small-pox"

Either of "two likely, healthy Negro Women" is for sale, "as they disagree together;" one is about 30 and one about 18, and both have had smallpox

Widow Marie Anne Chamaillard and brothers advise public that her son Noel Réaume "is become lunatick, and incapable[...]to manage his own affairs"

Mary Edge announces that she and her son ("lately from Detroit") will take over her late husband's "business of a Black and White-smith" in Montreal

Montreal "Tin-man" announces that his apprentice "Bishop Forsyth, who was brought in a prisoner with his parents from Wyoming," has run away

Evening "Mathematical Class" to run through winter with "Euclid's Elements[...]demonstrated either Geometrically or Algebraically," plus trigonometry etc.

François Grefart announces that his wife "has eloped from his House by stealth" and that he "is giving intimation to all not to trust her a sol marqué"

Nova Scotia
Nova Scotia Assembly to examine "defenceless state of the settlements distant from Halifax," such as plundered towns on or near Minas Basin

Assembly wants Elizabeth Amelia Belcher, "Daughter of the late Worthy Chief Justice Belcher, who is left destitute," to receive £50 per year for life

Prince Edward Island
Legal actions over land must be sued within 20 years of current assembly session; exceptions for minors, married women, Non compos mentis, convicts, absentees

John MacDonald faces loss of St. John's Island lots for quit-rent non-payment, plus tenant and government trouble, all hampering Island's success

Labrador
Moravian missionaries at Nain, Labrador report 22 Inuit killed when avalanche came down hill where they had built their "Esquimaux winter hauss"

Elsewhere
Kitchi Negou and other Ojibwe chiefs sign treaty transferring Michilimackinac Island to Crown for £5,000, recorded on deed and 7-ft. long wampum belt

For "a consideration amounting to about 300 suits of clothing," four Ojibwe and Mississauga chiefs transfer territory just west of Niagara River to Crown

"Before the fatal attack of the small pox[...]in the year 1781, all these nations of Indians [trading to Hudson's Bay] were much more numerous"

Hudson's Bay Company's Fort Albany chief glad that inland post Henley House has no provisions problem, ensuring "success of the upland business"

Acadians are one quarter of Baltimore, Md. population, live in poorest part of town and retain their language and religion, though priests are negligent

References 

 
Canada
81